Simon Gerard McDonald, Baron McDonald of Salford,  (born 9 March 1961) is a British former diplomat who was the  Permanent Under-Secretary at the Foreign and Commonwealth Office and Head of the Diplomatic Service until September 2020. He was the last professional head of the Foreign & Commonwealth Office before the creation of the Foreign, Commonwealth and Development Office. He has been the Master of Christ's College, Cambridge, since September 2022.

In July 2022 McDonald wrote a letter to the Parliamentary Commissioner for Standards stating that denials of previous allegations against Chris Pincher by the Prime Minister Boris Johnson were untrue. The letter was described as an "extraordinary, devastating intervention", and was followed by resignations of senior cabinet ministers, ultimately leading to Johnson's announcement of his resignation on 7 July 2022.

Early life and education
McDonald was born on 9 March 1961 in Salford, Lancashire. He was educated at De La Salle College, a direct grant grammar school in Salford. He then studied history at Pembroke College, Cambridge, graduating with a Bachelor of Arts (BA) degree; as per tradition, his BA was promoted to a Master of Arts (MA Cantab) degree.

Career

Diplomatic career
McDonald joined the Foreign and Commonwealth Office (FCO) in 1982 and served in Jeddah, Riyadh, Bonn and Washington, D.C. as well as in London. He was Principal Private Secretary to the Foreign Secretary 2001–03; Ambassador to Israel 2003–06; Director for Iraq at the FCO 2006–07; Foreign Policy Adviser to the Prime Minister and Head of the Overseas and Defence Secretariat at the Cabinet Office 2007–10; and was appointed Ambassador to Germany .

In September 2015, McDonald became Permanent Under-Secretary in the Foreign and Commonwealth Office and Head of the Diplomatic Service, replacing Sir Simon Fraser. As of 2015, McDonald was paid a salary of between £180,000 and £184,999 by the Foreign Office, making him one of the 328 most highly paid people in the British public sector at that time.

In April 2020, McDonald stated to the Foreign Affairs Select Committee that it was a political decision to opt out of an EU scheme to bulk-buy ventilators and protective equipment for NHS workers to respond to the coronavirus pandemic. The comments raised concerns that ministers had put Brexit ahead of responding to the public health crisis. Following comments, Matt Hancock used Downing Street's daily press briefing to state that as far as he knew, there had been no political decision not to participate. McDonald subsequently wrote to the committee chairperson, Tom Tugendhat, stating that he had "inadvertently and wrongly" misadvised the committee "due to a misunderstanding".

In June 2020, it was announced that McDonald would take early retirement in autumn 2020. The move stemmed from the merger of the Foreign and Commonwealth Office with the Department for International Development, with Prime Minister Boris Johnson signalling that he wanted a new leader to head up the combined department.

House of Lords
McDonald was nominated for a life peerage in the 2020 Political Honours. On 27 January 2021, he was created Baron McDonald of Salford,	of Pendleton in the City of Salford. He made his maiden speech on 2 March 2021. He sits in the House of Lords as a crossbencher.

Academic career
On 23 November 2021, McDonald was announced as Master-elect of Christ's College, Cambridge in succession to Jane Stapleton. His term of office began on 1 September 2022.

Chris Pincher scandal

Following the resignation of Deputy Chief Whip Chris Pincher over an incident of sexual groping, McDonald wrote in July 2022 to the Parliamentary Commissioner for Standards on previous official complaints made against Pincher, stating that the claim there had been no previous official complaints against Pincher was untrue. A Guardian editorial described the letter as an "extraordinary, devastating intervention", which convinced Chancellor Rishi Sunak, Health Secretary Sajid Javid, and many others to resign from Boris Johnson's government from 5 July 2022.

Honours
McDonald was appointed Companion of the Order of St Michael and St George (CMG) in the 2004 New Year Honours and Knight Commander of the Order of St Michael and St George (KCMG) in the 2014 Birthday Honours for services to British foreign policy and British interests in Germany. He was appointed Knight Commander of the Royal Victorian Order (KCVO) during the Queen's state visit to Germany in June 2015. He was appointed Knight Grand Cross of the Order of St Michael and St George (GCMG) in the 2021 Birthday Honours for services to British foreign policy.

Family
In 1989 Simon McDonald married Olivia, daughter of Sir Patrick Wright, later Baron Wright of Richmond, who had also been Permanent Under-Secretary at the FCO (1986–1991). Simon and Olivia have two sons and two daughters.

Notelist

References

 
 

1961 births
Living people
Alumni of Pembroke College, Cambridge
Crossbench life peers
Members of HM Diplomatic Service
Principal Private Secretaries to the Secretary of State for Foreign and Commonwealth Affairs
Ambassadors of the United Kingdom to Israel
Ambassadors of the United Kingdom to Germany
Permanent Under-Secretaries of State for Foreign Affairs
Knights Grand Cross of the Order of St Michael and St George
Knights Commander of the Royal Victorian Order
Life peers created by Elizabeth II
20th-century British diplomats
21st-century British diplomats